Konnaba, in English write as Koneba, is a woreda in Afar Region, Ethiopia. A triangle-shaped district in the Administrative Zone 2, Konaba is located near the base of the eastern escarpment of the Ethiopian Highlands, and bordered on the west by the Tigray Region, on the north by Dallol, and on the east by Berhale and koneba woreda has 7 kebeles names by  koneba ena balbal, adad ena farasdage, guqa ena kedahara, uruc ena ede gacnu, fisho, wacdes and alceena and koneba is the historical woreda in afar it has Gold.

The major town in Koneba is Koneba and Farasdage.

The average elevation in this woreda is 1150 meters above sea level. , Koneba has 38 kilometers of all-weather gravel road and 79 kilometers of community roads; about 13% of the total population has access to drinking water.

Demographics 
Based on the 2007 Census conducted by the Central Statistical Agency of Ethiopia (CSA), this woreda has a total population of 54,198, of whom 29,355 are men and 24,843 women; with an area of 483.16 square kilometers, Koneba has a population density of 112.17. While 3,031 or 5.59% are urban inhabitants, a further 366 or 0.68% are pastoralists. A total of 7,698 households were counted in this woreda, which results in an average of 7.0 persons to a household, and 7,875 housing units. 99.35% of the population said they were Muslim.

Notes 

Districts of Afar Region